Princeville is a village in Peoria County, Illinois, United States. The population was 1,738 at the 2010 census, up from 1,621 in 2000. It is part of the Peoria, Illinois Metropolitan Statistical Area.

Geography

Demographics

As of the census of 2000, there were 1,621 people, 659 households, and 452 families residing in the village. The racial makeup of the village was 97.59% White, 0.31% Native American, 0.12% Asian, 1.30% from other races, and 0.68% from two or more races. Hispanic or Latino of any race were 2.71% of the population.

There were 659 households, out of which 33.1% had children under the age of 18 living with them, 56.4% were married couples living together, 10.0% had a female householder with no husband present, and 31.3% were non-families. 28.2% of all households were made up of individuals, and 13.2% had someone living alone who was 65 years of age or older. The average household size was 2.46 and the average family size was 3.02.

In the village, the population was spread out, with 26.5% under the age of 18, 7.3% from 18 to 24, 27.5% from 25 to 44, 21.5% from 45 to 64, and 17.3% who were 65 years of age or older. The median age was 37 years. For every 100 females, there were 92.7 males. For every 100 females age 18 and over, there were 89.8 males.

The median income for a household in the village was $40,060, and the median income for a family was $49,118. Males had a median income of $31,957 versus $22,727 for females. The per capita income for the village was $19,137. About 6.7% of families and 6.7% of the population were below the poverty line, including 8.2% of those under age 18 and 3.3% of those age 65 or over.

Notable person

 Emmett Seery, outfielder for several Major League Baseball teams (1884-1892); born in Princeville

Transportation
SR 90 in Princeville runs East and West through Princeville. SR 91 shares with SR 90 until it reaches Santa Fe Ave in Princeville. Those highways are all two lane highways.

Schools
Princeville is District 326. They have 17 buses for students. It is a district with Princeville Junior/Senior High School, and Princeville Grade School. Princeville is a small community school district.

 Princeville Elementary School Grades K-5
Princeville Junior/Senior High School Grades 6-12

References

External links
 

Villages in Peoria County, Illinois
Villages in Illinois
Peoria metropolitan area, Illinois